Le'coe Willingham (born February 10, 1981) is an American professional basketball player. Attending Hephzibah High School, she won the 1998 AAAA Georgia State Women's state high jump title. She last played the forward position for the Atlanta Dream in the WNBA.

College career 
Among Auburn's top ten career leaders in starts, points, field goals made, field goal percentage, free throws made, free throws attempted, rebounds. Willingham is Auburn's seventh all-time scorer and sixth all-time rebounder.

Auburn statistics
Source

WNBA career 
Willingham began her career with the Connecticut Sun. She was not drafted, but instead signed as a free agent by the Sun. During the 2008 offseason, the Phoenix Mercury signed her as a free agent. In the 2010 offseason, she signed a free agent deal with the Seattle Storm. Willingham helped the Seattle Storm win their second championship in 2010.

References 

1981 births
Living people
American women's basketball players
Auburn Tigers women's basketball players
Basketball players from Augusta, Georgia
Connecticut Sun players
Forwards (basketball)
Phoenix Mercury players
Undrafted Women's National Basketball Association players